Whiting Bay is bay in Whiting, Maine, in the United States.

Bays of Washington County, Maine
Bays of Maine